Chandra Danette Wilson (born August 27, 1969) is an American actress and director. She is best known for her role as Dr. Miranda Bailey in the ABC television drama Grey's Anatomy since 2005, for which she has been nominated for the Emmy for Best Supporting Actress four times. She also played the character of Bailey on Private Practice and Station 19.  She made her New York stage debut in 1991 and began to land guest spots on a variety of prime-time television shows. She made her first film appearance in the 1993 film Philadelphia.

Early life
Wilson was born and raised in Houston, Texas. Her mother, a postal worker, wanted to keep her daughter active, so she enrolled Chandra in numerous after-school activities. "Starting at age four, my mom decided that she was not going to have an idle child in the house," Wilson recalls. "So I started taking dance lessons on Tuesdays and Thursdays, and then I was in acting classes on Mondays, Wednesdays and Fridays, and I was also modeling on Saturdays. And that was my childhood." "My first show was The King and I when I was five" she said in an interview with Broadway.com.

By the age of five, Wilson was performing in musicals with Houston's Theatre Under the Stars Company. She attended Houston's High School for the Performing and Visual Arts and continued on to New York University's Tisch School of the Arts, graduating with a BFA in drama in 1991. For the next four years, from 1991–95, she studied at the Lee Strasberg Theatre & Film Institute while at the same time racking up professional theater credits. She made her New York debut in a 1991 production of The Good Times Are Killing Me and won a Theater World Award for Outstanding Debut Performance. Her other early stage credits include off-Broadway productions of Paper Moon: The Musical and Little Shop of Horrors.

While she was making a name for herself on the New York stage, Wilson also began to land guest spots on a variety of prime-time television shows. She appeared on The Cosby Show (1989), Law & Order (1992) and CBS Schoolbreak Special (1992). She made her big-screen debut alongside Tom Hanks and Denzel Washington in the highly acclaimed 1993 film Philadelphia. Despite receiving high praise for nearly all of her performances, however, Wilson struggled for many years to gain more prominent roles. For eight years, while she tried to break into major stardom, Wilson worked part-time as a teller at Deutsche Bank in order to make ends meet.

In 2005, Wilson landed her breakthrough role as Dr. Miranda Bailey on the hit ABC show Grey's Anatomy.

Career
Wilson's first regular network TV role was in the short-lived series Bob Patterson (2001), a post-Seinfeld vehicle for Jason Alexander. In a review for USA Today, Robert Bianco called Wilson "the only person in the show you can imagine wanting to see again". Similarly, the Los Angeles Times said, "The only character here that's amusingly written is Bob's new assistant, Claudia (Chandra Wilson)". She also appeared on Third Watch (2001), Law & Order SVU, Sex and the City (2002), and The Sopranos (2004), and had a small role in Lone Star (1996).

Wilson also had career in theater, where she played Bonna Willis in The Good Times Are Killing Me, and was featured in the Tony-nominated musical Caroline, or Change. Wilson is an accomplished singer and has sung in several productions, including On the Town (1998), Avenue Q (2003) and Caroline, or Change (2004).

Wilson worked as a temp at Deutsche Bank Alex. Brown where she made presentations for the investment banking units. She worked at the Banker's Trust location on 130 Liberty Street, right across the street from the South Tower of the World Trade Center through 9/11 when that building was lost to the terrorist attacks. Wilson was still working at a bank when she auditioned for the Grey's Anatomy pilot. She was cast as Miranda Bailey, a role initially envisioned as a blonde-haired white woman. The show became a success. Wilson was nominated in 2006, 2007, 2008 and 2009 for an Emmy Award for Best Supporting Actress in a Drama. She was nominated and won the Screen Actors Guild Award in 2007 for Outstanding Female Actor in a Drama Series; she also won a SAG Award as part of the Grey's Anatomy cast, which won Best Ensemble in a Drama Series.

Wilson made her television directing debut with the episode "Give Peace a Chance", the 7th episode in season 6 of Grey's Anatomy. She also directed episode 17, "Push", of the same season and the fifth episode of season 7, "Almost Grown", the 21st episode of eight season, "Moment of Truth", "Second Opinion", the 6th episode of ninth season and "Transplant Wasteland", the 17th episode of ninth season. The part of Dr. Bailey, supervisor to the hospital interns, had been written for a petite, blonde-haired white woman, but Wilson, a full-figured African-American woman, gave such an impressive audition that the show's producers decided to give her the part. "Besides," she later joked, "I knew the casting director." Wilson earned rave reviews for her performance as the tough-as-nails Dr. Bailey. Wilson was nominated for four consecutive Emmy Awards (2006-2009) and won four consecutive NAACP Image Awards (2007-2010) for Best Supporting Actress in a Drama Series. She also won the 2008 People's Choice Award for Favorite Scene-Stealing Star. In 2009, while still starring on Grey's Anatomy, Wilson took a brief hiatus from the show to go to Broadway as Mama Morton in a revival of Chicago.

Wilson explained the only difference between her acting career now and her acting career a decade ago is that people actually recognize her on the street. "The only difference in my career now is the visibility I have," she insisted. "People say I made it now, but I feel like I made it doing summer stock." She is also clear-headed about the fragility of her new-found fame and fortune. Upon finally leaving her job at Deutsche Bank to focus solely on her role in Grey's Anatomy, Wilson was careful not to burn any bridges. She said, "They told me I could come back if acting doesn't work out. I told them, 'Keep my seat warm.'"

In 2014, Wilson made a guest starring appearance on the ABC Daytime soap opera General Hospital as patient Tina Estrada. In 2018, she appeared on General Hospital as Dr. Linda Massey. In April 2019, it was announced Wilson will make a third guest star appearance on General Hospital, but this time as Sydney Val Jean in May 2019.

Personal life
In Parade May 2007 edition, Wilson described herself as "I'm in a relationship but I'm not married". She has been with her partner for 31 years as of 2019. Wilson and her partner have 3 children; their daughter Sarina was born in 1992, daughter Joylin was born in 1998, and son Michael was born on October 31, 2005.

Activism
Wilson is an activist for the cause of cyclic vomiting syndrome and serves as the spokesperson for the Cyclic Vomiting Syndrome Association, as well as, the celebrity ambassador for CureMito! after her teenage daughter, Sarina, developed the disease in 2010. For the ninth season of Grey's Anatomy Wilson met with the producers and pitched the idea of featuring cyclic vomiting syndrome in an upcoming episode.  The episode, "Second Opinion", aired on November 15, 2012 and was directed by Wilson.

She also is an advocate for people with mental and/or substance use disorders. In 2015, she hosted the 10th Annual Voice Awards event for the Substance Abuse and Mental Health Services Administration.

Filmography

Film

Television

Director

Stage

Awards and nominations

References

External links

1969 births
Living people
Tisch School of the Arts alumni
Actresses from Houston
Outstanding Performance by a Female Actor in a Drama Series Screen Actors Guild Award winners
American women television directors
African-American television directors
American television directors
American television actresses
African-American actresses
American film actresses
American musical theatre actresses
American stage actresses
20th-century American actresses
21st-century American actresses
High School for the Performing and Visual Arts alumni
African-American women singers